Cold Water Army may refer to:

 Cold Water Army (rock band)
 Cold Water Army (temperance organization)